Magdalemitra is a genus of sea snails, marine gastropod mollusks in the family Volutomitridae.

Species
Species within the genus Magdalemitra include:

 Magdalemitra gilesorum Kilburn, 1974

References

Volutomitridae
Monotypic gastropod genera